Harperella is a monotypic genus of flowering plants in the family Apiaceae. Its only species is Harperella nodosa (synonym Ptilimnium nodosum), known as piedmont mock bishopweed and harperella. It is native to riparian environments in the Southeastern United States, found at sites in West Virginia, Maryland, several Southeastern states such as Alabama and North Carolina, and the Ouachita National Forest in Arkansas and Oklahoma. As Ptilimnium nodosum, it was placed on the United States' Endangered Species List in 1988.

Taxonomy
The genus was first described by Joseph Nelson Rose in 1905 under the name Harperia. However, this was a later homonym of a genus in the family Restionaceae, and so illegitimate. In 1906, Rose published the replacement name Harperella.

References

External links 
 U.S. Fish & Wildlife Service: Ptilimnium nodosum (Harperella) in North Carolina

Apioideae
Monotypic Apioideae genera